Margareta Simu (born 2 May 1953 in Västerås) is a Swedish former racewalking athlete. She competed three times at the IAAF World Race Walking Cup and was the winner in 1975 and bronze medallist in 1977. On her last appearance in 1979 she placed eighth.

Simu broke world racewalking records several times. She set a 10 km walk world record of 51:01 minutes in 1972, finally improving on Stina Lindberg's near-30-year-old time. She bettered this to 49:04 minutes in 1976 and again to 48:53 minutes in 1978. Norwegian Thorill Gylder took that honour away from her in 1978 with a new best of 48:40 minutes. Simu's time of 1:47:10 hours, set in 1973, was a 20 km walk world record for nearly four years. She also broke the world indoor record for the 3000 m on four occasions (between 1974 and 1978).

Simu was a three-time medallist at the Nordic Race Walking Championships, wither her best result being a gold medal in 1975. She was twice champion at the short-lived Nordic Indoor Race Walking Championships, topping the podium in the 3000 m walk in 1974 and 1978, as well as taking bronze  behind Siv Gustafsson and Elisabeth Olsson in 1976. She was a seven-time Swedish national champion in racewalking, at distances from 3000 m to 10 km.

International competitions

National titles
Swedish Athletics Championships
3000 m walk: 1971, 1975
5000 m walk: 1974, 1975, 1976
10 km walk: 1974, 1975

References

Living people
1953 births
Swedish female racewalkers
World record setters in athletics (track and field)
World Athletics Race Walking Team Championships winners
Sportspeople from Västerås